The coat of arms of Kaliningrad is the official heraldic achievement of Kaliningrad in Russia.

Description
The arms displays a medieval ship for the harbour on the Baltic Sea, which has been important for the city since its foundation in the Middle Ages. The ship is flying a pennant resembling the Russian Navy Ensign on the top of the mast.

In the middle is an inescutcheon with the old smaller arms of the city, used when it was called Königsberg (it changed names in 1946, following its seizure by the Soviet Union from Germany). Königsberg is German for "King's Mountain"; the crown may be a symbol for the king. The adjacent towns of Kneiphof and Neustadt Königsberg (originally called Löbenicht) were merged with Königsberg in 1724 and their three shields were often used together during the following time, supported by the Prussian eagle.

The city uses a flag which is a banner of arms.

References

Kaliningrad
Kaliningrad
Kaliningrad
Kaliningrad
Kaliningrad
Kaliningrad
Kaliningrad